Aakraman is a 1975 Hindi war film, produced by Jagdish Kumar and directed by J. Om Prakash. The war film stars Ashok Kumar, Sanjeev Kumar, Rekha, Rakesh Roshan, Farida Jalal, Sujit Kumar, Asrani, Keshto Mukherjee, Mumtaz Shanti and Rajesh Khanna. The music is by Laxmikant Pyarelal. The Hindustan Times noted that Rajesh Khanna in his extended guest appearance as the disabled Punjabi soldier with two emotional songs picturised on him was inspiring.

Plot
This film portrays a love triangle where two army officers (Sanjeev Kumar and Rakesh Roshan) fall in love with Sheetal (Rekha). When the Indo-Pak war breaks out, all hell breaks loose and the junior officer (Rakesh Roshan) vows to take revenge on the senior officer (Sanjeev Kumar) for proposing marriage to Sheetal. But when they are posted on the frontline during the war, when the opportunity presents itself, he  realises his mistake and refrains. In the end, the senior officer however gets killed by a Pakistani sentry by deceit and the national flag falls on him. 

Apart from the romantic drama, the film also showcases the emotional remembrance of a father (Ashok Kumar) for his KIA son (not shown), who has died in the 1965 Indo-Pak-war and highlights the bravery and courage of Indian soldiers and airmen during the last days of the 1971 war when India defeats Pakistan and Bangladesh is created.

Cast
Ashok Kumar		
Sanjeev Kumar	...	Major Ajay Verma
Rajesh Khanna	...	Karnail Singh (extended guest appearance)
Rekha	...	Sheetal
Rakesh Roshan	...	Lieutenant Sunil Mehra 
Sulochana Latkar	...	Mrs. Verma (Ajay's Mother)
Farida Jalal	...	Asha
Asrani		
Sujit Kumar	...	Pratap Singh
Keshto Mukherjee	...	Rangeela
Sunder	...	Laddoo
Ravindra Kapoor	...	Subedar Usman (as Ravinder Kapoor)
Kuljeet	...	(as Kuljit)
Deepak Raj		
Mumtaz Shanti

Soundtrack

References

External links
 

1975 films
1970s Hindi-language films
Films scored by Laxmikant–Pyarelal
Indian war films
Indian Army in films
Films based on Indo-Pakistani wars and conflicts
Military of Pakistan in films
Films directed by J. Om Prakash